In Māori mythology, Toto was a chief in Hawaiki. He had two daughters, Kuramarotini, the wife of Hoturapa, and Rongorongo, the wife of Turi. Toto felled a tree and made two canoes. One of these, the Aotea, was given to Turi, and was sailed by him to New Zealand. The other canoe, the Matahourua, was later commandeered by Kupe who sailed it to New Zealand with Kuramarotini, Hoturapa's wife (Tregear 1891:527).

References
E.R. Tregear, Maori-Polynesian Comparative Dictionary (Lyon and Blair: Lambton Quay), 1891.

Māori mythology
Legendary Polynesian people